Patrick Guérette (March 17, 1918 – November 21, 1997) was a Canadian politician. He served in the Legislative Assembly of New Brunswick from 1960 to 1967 as member of the Liberal party.

References

20th-century births
1997 deaths
People from Restigouche County, New Brunswick